13 Number Feku Ostagar Lane is a Bengali-language Pakistani film which was released in 1966. This film is the first pure comedy film of Dhallywood. This is the first film of Razzak in Dhallywood.

Cast
 Baby Zaman - Tetul
 Sujata - Falguni
 Sirajul Islam - Mr. Rabbani, Bariwala
 Sumita Devi - Minu, Bariwali
 Anwara - Bithi, Falguni's sister
 Razzak - Pintu
 Khan Joynul - Pakshi
 Altaf - Pagla
 Kamal Ahmed
 Tejen Chakraborty
 Fatty Mohsin
 Rebecca - Ratri Ray

Music
All songs were composed by Satya Saha. All songs were written by Anisul Haque Chowdhury.

"Gaan Noy Gaan Noy Jeno Siren" - Ferdousi Rahman

References

External links
 

1966 films
Pakistani comedy films
Bengali-language Pakistani films
Films scored by Satya Saha
1960s Bengali-language films
1966 comedy films